Owen James Trainor Southwell (1892–1961) was an American architect who practiced in the early 1900s in Atlanta, Georgia; Beaumont, Texas; and New Iberia, Louisiana. His architecture style was a mixture of Southern greek revival, other revival styles, and antebellum.

Biography 
Southwell was born September 20, 1892 in New Iberia, Louisiana, to parents Catherine Trainor and William D. Southwell. Southwell's father lived in New York between 1885-1888 while studying architecture, returning to New Iberia to open an architecture practice in 1888. Southwell attended high school in Beaumont, Texas. Southwell attended Tulane University for two years before transferring to Carnegie Institute of Technology (now known as Carnegie Mellon University), where he graduated with a bachelor's degree in Architecture in 1915. At Carnegie Tech he studied with architect Henry Hornbostel. Between 1914–1916, Southwell was hired as an instructor of architecture at University of Illinois at Urbana-Champaign.

During World War I, Southwell served in the Naval Reserve. He was married to Yvonne Arnandez (1895–1993).

He lived in Atlanta from 1919-1931, moving there to manage Henry Hornbostel’s local architecture office. During the early years in Atlanta, Southwell worked on designing early buildings for Emory University. By 1923, Southwell opened his own private architecture practice in Atlanta. In 1931, Southwell moved back to New Iberia because of the Great Depression, and moving his private architecture practice with him.

Southwell died in April 1961, at the age of 68, and is buried in Saint Peter's Cemetery in New Iberia.

Notable buildings 

 1888–1953 – Old St. Peter’s Church in New Iberia, Louisiana (now demolished)
1927 – Sardis United Methodist Church, Atlanta, Georgia
 1928 – Caed Mile Failte, the John Henry Phelan mansion and 15.4-acre estate in Beaumont, Texas
 c.1936 – Buddha House at the Jungle Gardens in Avery Island, Louisiana
1937 – Essanee Theater in New Iberia, Louisiana
 1953 – St. Peter’s Church in New Iberia, Louisiana (same location as the earlier church)
 1951 – Sugar Festival Building in New Iberia, Louisiana

References

External links 

 Southwell, Owen J. (1892-1961) papers, University of Louisiana at Lafayette

1892 births
1961 deaths
Architects from Louisiana
Architects from Atlanta
Architects from Texas
Carnegie Mellon University alumni
Military personnel from Louisiana
People from New Iberia, Louisiana
University of Illinois Urbana-Champaign faculty
20th-century American architects
20th-century American educators
American residential architects